The Equalizer is an American spy thriller multimedia franchise initially co-created by Michael Sloan and Richard Lindheim, and originating with a CBS television series from 1985 to 1989, starring Edward Woodward. The concept was thereafter rebooted twice, first with a pair of movies (The Equalizer in 2014 and The Equalizer 2 in 2018) starring Denzel Washington, slated to be followed up by a third film in 2023, and secondly with a reimagined 2021 television series, also on CBS, starring Queen Latifah as Robyn McCall. A series of novels featuring Robert McCall has been written by original co-creator Michael Sloan, with the first volume published in 2014.

The franchise centers on a retired intelligence agent with a mysterious past, who uses the skills from his former career to exact justice on behalf of innocent people who find themselves in dangerous circumstances, while sometimes also dealing with people from his past in covert operations who want to pull him back in or settle old scores.

Television series

Original series (1985–1989)

The original show ran for four seasons of 22 episodes each. It was initially renewed for a fifth season (causing Keith Szarabajka to turn down a role on Midnight Caller). The show was later cancelled, though, due to a row between CBS and Universal Studios over the renewal of Murder, She Wrote. In The Story of The Equalizer, created for the DVD box set, executive producer Coleman Luck also stated that Universal requested a script for a crossover episode with Magnum, P.I. despite the objections of the crew due to the vastly different tones of the two shows. Ultimately, the crossover did not happen, and the episode was rewritten as "Beyond Control".

The show's theme music was created by composer/performer Stewart Copeland, his first effort at theme music composition in what would become a lengthy career in that field. The track is called "Busy Equalizing". An extended version appears on his album The Equalizer and Other Cliff Hangers.

Reboot series (2021–present)

In November 2019, CBS announced that a reboot is in development with Queen Latifah in the lead role as Robyn McCall. Andrew Marlowe and Terri Miller were to serve as showrunners with Latifah herself as an executive producer. On January 27, 2020, CBS ordered a pilot for the new version.

The series was among the 14 pilots ordered by CBS in February 2020 and was fast tracked to series the following March, as they were unable to film their pilots where Universal Television was shut down because of the COVID-19 pandemic.

On May 8, 2020, CBS picked up the series and they added Chris Noth as William Bishop, a quirky ex-CIA director, who is the opposite of Latifah. It premiered on February 7, 2021, after Super Bowl LV.

In March 2021, the series was renewed for a second season, which premiered on October 10, 2021. In May 2022, the series was renewed for its third and fourth seasons. The third season was set to premiere on October 2, 2022.

Film series

The Equalizer (2014)

In June 2010, Russell Crowe reportedly was looking to bring The Equalizer to the big screen and to be directed by Paul Haggis, with Crowe attached to play Robert McCall.

In December 2011,  Denzel Washington was announced to star in the title role of the film version, to be financed by Sony Pictures Entertainment and Escape Artists. Director Antoine Fuqua came on board to direct on March 21, 2013, reuniting him with Washington after their successful collaboration on the 2001 Oscar-winning film Training Day. Chloë Grace Moretz was announced as a co-star on May 10, 2013; Anna Kendrick, Kelly Macdonald, and Nina Dobrev were also considered. On May 31, 2013, Melissa Leo was cast in the film. Leo previously worked with Washington in the 2012 film Flight, and with Fuqua in Olympus Has Fallen (2013). Coincidentally, Leo actually guest-starred in a season-one episode of the original Equalizer television series titled "The Defector", in which she portrayed the daughter of a former Soviet agent, who enlists McCall's help to defect to the United States. Marton Csokas was cast to play the villain on May 17.

The Equalizer grossed $101.5 million in North America and $90.8 million in other territories for a worldwide gross of $192.3 million, against a net production budget of $55 million.

The Equalizer 2 (2018)

On February 24, 2014, seven months before the release of The Equalizer,  Sony Pictures and Escape Artists announced they were planning a sequel, with Richard Wenk penning the script again. In early October 2014, Antoine Fuqua stated that  sequel to the film would be made only if audiences and Denzel Washington wanted it. He said he was an interesting character, and that the sequel could have more of an international flavor.

On April 22, 2015, Sony officially announced a sequel, with Washington returning to his role as vigilante Robert McCall. Fuqua's returning was not yet confirmed. In September 2016, producer Todd Black revealed that the script of the film was complete, and that Fuqua would return to direct, with shooting set to begin in September 2017.

The Equalizer 2 grossed $102.1 million in the United States and Canada, and $88.3 million in other territories, for a total worldwide gross of $190.4 million, against a production budget of $62 million.

The Equalizer 3 (2023)

A third film is in the works with Washington and director Antoine Fuqua returning, and filming was expected to start in late 2022.

Literature 
A series of novels featuring Robert McCall has been written by the original co-creator Michael Sloan. The first is simply entitled The Equalizer published in 2014, followed by Killed in Action: An Equalizer Novel, which was released in 2018. The novels are a modern reimagining of the original series and focus on McCall leaving the Company and eventually becoming a private investigator in New York. It also features a number of original recurring characters from the television series, such as Mickey Kostmayer, Control, and Scott McCall. A third novel, Equalizer: Requiem was released in 2020.

See also
 Callan, a 1960s–1970s TV spy series in which Woodward played a character similar to that of The Equalizers Robert McCall.

References

External links
 

 
1985 American television series debuts
1989 American television series endings
1980s American crime drama television series
Edgar Award-winning works
Espionage television series
English-language television shows
American detective television series
CBS original programming
Sony Pictures films
Television series by Universal Television
Television shows set in New York City
Television shows adapted into films
Television shows filmed in New York (state)
American action adventure television series
American spy thriller television series
Vigilante television series
Columbia Pictures franchises
NBCUniversal Television Group franchises